Maria Jarema (24 November 1908 – 1 November 1958) was a Polish painter, sculptor, scenographer and actress.

Life and career

She was born on 24 November 1908 in Staryi Sambir in the Kingdom of Galicia and Lodomeria (currently Ukraine). In the years 1929–1935, she studied sculpture at the Jan Matejko Academy of Fine Arts in Kraków, under supervision of Xawery Dunikowski. In 1930, she co-founded the avant-garde, radical left Kraków Group.

Before the outbreak of World War II, she mostly dealt with sculpture but after the war she focused on painting. Her works were mainly abstract paintings. Since 1951, she created monotypes. Her works show a great fascination with the human shape and its place in space as well as the depiction of movement in painting. Balancing between figurative displays and abstract signs is also a distinctive feature of her paintings. She was one of the founders of the avant-garde theatre Cricot (1933–1938) alongside Józef Jarema, Henryk Gotlib and Zbigniew Pronaszko. She is also known for her artistic collaboration with Tadeusz Kantor and his experimental theatre Cricot 2 as well as Adam Polewka's puppet theatre. Her paintings have been exhibited in a number of museums in Poland including the Zachęta National Gallery of Art.

In 2018, her painting  (Forms) was sold at an auction for over 1 million zlotys (ca. $270,000), which made it the most expensive painting by a female artist sold in Poland at the time.

In 2019, Agnieszka Dauksza published a Nike Award-nominated book  focusing on the life of Jarema and her artistic legacy.

Personal life
She was a sister of painter Józef Jarema and actor Władysław Jarema – the founder of the Groteska Theatre in Kraków. She married novelist and short story writer Kornel Filipowicz.

See also
List of Polish painters
List of Polish sculptors

References

1908 births
1958 deaths
20th-century Polish painters
Polish women painters
Polish sculptors
Artists from Kraków
Sibling artists
Polish women sculptors
20th-century painters
20th-century Polish women artists